John Kristian "Kris" Foster (born August 30, 1974) is a former Major League Baseball pitcher.

External links

1974 births
Living people
Baseball players from New Jersey
Baltimore Orioles players
Major League Baseball pitchers
Sportspeople from Morris County, New Jersey
Gulf Coast Expos players
Yakima Bears players
San Bernardino Stampede players
Vero Beach Dodgers players
San Antonio Missions players
Jacksonville Suns players
Las Vegas 51s players
Rochester Red Wings players
Pawtucket Red Sox players
Florida SouthWestern Buccaneers baseball players